Hemielimaea is a genus of Asian bush crickets found in Indochina and China (including Taiwan).

Species 
, subgenera and species include:

Subgenus Hemielimaea Brunner von Wattenwyl, 1878
Hemielimaea adeviara Song, Yuan & Liu, 2012
Hemielimaea caricercata Ingrisch, 2007
Hemielimaea chinensis Brunner von Wattenwyl, 1878
Hemielimaea formosana (Shiraki, 1930)
Hemielimaea kuatun Ingrisch, 2007
Hemielimaea mannhardti (Krausze, 1903)
Hemielimaea omeishanica Gorochov, 2007
Hemielimaea paracari Liu, Wang & Ma, 2013
Hemielimaea parva Liu, Wang & Ma, 2013
Hemielimaea proxima Gorochov, 2004
Hemielimaea reducta Gorochov, 2004
Hemielimaea vietnamensis Gorochov, 2004

Subgenus Pseudelimaea Gorochov, 2004
Hemielimaea cucullata Ingrisch, 1990
Hemielimaea nigerrima (Krausze, 1903)
Hemielimaea procera Ingrisch, 1990
Hemielimaea sergeii Gorochov, 2004
Hemielimaea tonkinensis Dohrn, 1906

References

External links

Phaneropterinae
Tettigoniidae genera
Insects of Asia
Orthoptera of Indo-China